Young Street Bridge is a bridge in North Aberdeen, Washington. It covers a brief span along the Wishkah River, carrying a north/south-bound thoroughfare which connects the City of Aberdeen with the North Aberdeen neighborhood and other outlying communities.

Most notably, the bridge has been mentioned in numerous accounts as a  temporary home for Nirvana frontman Kurt Cobain. It is hinted at in the lyrics of the song "Something in the Way". The walls of the bridge are completely covered in graffiti inspired by Cobain and Nirvana. 

In 2015, the Kurt Cobain Memorial Park was created nearby.

References

External links

Transportation buildings and structures in Grays Harbor County, Washington
Road bridges in Washington (state)
Aberdeen, Washington